Le Cirque: A Table In Heaven is a 2007 American documentary film directed by Andrew Rossi about the reopening of the Le Cirque restaurant in New York City.  Before being released by HBO, the film premiered at the 2007 Full Frame Film Festival and went on to play at the 2007 Hamptons Film Festival, the 2008 Berlin International Film Festival, and the 2008 Sarasota Film Festival, among others.

References

External links

2007 films
2000s English-language films
2000s American films
Films directed by Andrew Rossi
HBO documentary films
American documentary films
Documentary films about food and drink
Documentary films about New York City